Datuk Abdul Rahman Bakri (born 10 November 1965) was the Member of the Parliament of Malaysia for the Sabak Bernam constituency in Selangor from 2008 to 2013, sitting as a member of the United Malays National Organisation (UMNO) party in the governing Barisan Nasional (BN) coalition. His parliamentary career ended with his conviction and imprisonment on corruption charges.

Abdul Rahman was elected to Parliament in the 2008 election for the UMNO-held seat of Sabak Bernam. He was previously a member of the Selangor State Legislative Assembly, representing the seat of Sungai Air Tawar for one term from 2004 to 2008.

Controversy
In November 2009, Abdul Rahman was charged with eight counts of misappropriating public funds while a member of the Selangor State Assembly. He pleaded not guilty to the charges, but in March 2012 was convicted and sentenced to six years imprisonment. His conviction was upheld on appeal.

Election results

Honours
  :
  Companion Class I of the Order of Malacca (DMSM) – Datuk (2009)

References

Living people
1965 births
People from Selangor
Malaysian people of Malay descent
Malaysian Muslims
United Malays National Organisation politicians
Members of the Dewan Rakyat
Members of the Selangor State Legislative Assembly
Malaysian prisoners and detainees
Prisoners and detainees of Malaysia